Pseudopoda spirembolus is a species of huntsman spider found in Japan.

Sparassidae
Chelicerates of Japan
Spiders of Asia
Spiders described in 2002